The Mixed duet free routine competition at the 2022 World Aquatics Championships was held on 24 and 25 June 2022.

Results
The preliminary round was started on 24 June at 10:00. The final was held on 25 June at 13:30.

Green denotes finalists

References

Mixed duet free routine